Mansyur S. (born Mansyur Subhawannur; November 30, 1948)
is an Indonesian singer, songwriter and actor. He is a star of the dangdut style of Indonesian music. He sings with an ensemble called Dangdut Manis, or "Sweet Dangdut". He appears on the Smithsonian Folkways collection, Indonesian Popular Music: Krongcong, Dangdut, & Langgam Jawa.        
These songs are his most famous songs:
"Rembulan Bersinar Lagi" and
"Anak Siapa".

References

1948 births
Indonesian dangdut singers
20th-century Indonesian male singers
Living people
Anugerah Musik Indonesia winners